Beyond the Wall(s) may refer to:

 Beyond the Wall (EP), an EP by Rage
 Beyond the Wall (album), an album by Kenny Garrett
 "Beyond the Wall" (Game of Thrones), episode 6 of the 7th season of the television series Game of Thrones
 Beyond the Wall: Pictland & The North, a supplement for the role-playing game Pendragon
 "Beyond the Wall" (short story), by Ambrose Bierce
 Beyond the Walls (1984 film), an Israeli film
 Beyond the Walls (2012 film), a French drama
 Beyond the Wall (2022 film), an Iranian drama
 Beyond the Walls (TV series), 2015 French horror miniseries, originally titled Au-delà des Murs
 Beyond the Wall, a 1961 book by Stephen Shore

See also
 Beyond the Wall of Sleep (disambiguation)
 Behind the Walls (disambiguation)